This is a list of broadcast television stations that are licensed in the U.S. state of Oklahoma.

Full-power stations
VC refers to the station's PSIP virtual channel. RF refers to the station's physical RF channel.

Defunct full-power stations
Channel 8: KSWB - CBS - Elk City (8/7/1961-8/11/1965)
Channel 8: KVIJ-TV - satellite of KVII-TV - Sayre (5/17/1966-1992) (same license as KSWB)
Channel 14: KLPR-TV - Ind. - Oklahoma City (6/1/1966-12/12/1967)
Channel 19: KMPT - Ind - Oklahoma City (11/8/1953-2/4/1955)
Channel 23: KCEB - NBC/DuMont - Tulsa (3/13/1954-12/25/1954)
Channel 25: KTVQ - ABC/NBC - Oklahoma City (11/1/1953-12/15/1955)

LPTV stations

Translators

See also
 Oklahoma media
 List of newspapers in Oklahoma
 List of radio stations in Oklahoma
 Media of locales in Oklahoma: Broken Arrow, Lawton, Norman, Oklahoma City, Tulsa

Bibliography

External links
 
 
  (Directory ceased in 2017)
 Oklahoma Association of Broadcasters
 
 
 

Oklahoma

Television stations